Justin Bedan Njoka Muturi (popularly known as JB) (born 28 April 1956) is the Current Attorney General of Kenya who also served as the seventh Speaker of the National Assembly of Kenya, in office from 2013 to 2022. He is the first Speaker to serve following the reestablishment of a bicameral Parliament, as mandated by the 2010 Constitution. On 28 March 2013, Muturi won the speakership after a second round of voting by Members of the National Assembly, beating former speaker Kenneth Marende by a 219–129 margin.

Muturi was first elected as a member of the Kenya African National Union to represent Siakago Constituency in Parliament following a 1999 byelection. He won reelection in 2002 and served as opposition chief whip and chair of the Public Investment Committee (PIC) during the 10th Parliament. He vied for re-election in 2007, but was defeated by Lenny Kivuti.

In 2013, Muturi ran for the Mbeere North parliamentary seat as a member of The National Alliance party, but lost to Muriuki Njagagua.

He served as a member of the Parliamentary Select Committee on the constitutional review from 1999 to 2004. He was elected KANU National Organising Secretary in Nov 2008 and was the PNU constitution committee chairman during the national constitutional talks from 2008–2010. In April 2011, he was appointed the chairman of the Centre for Multiparty Democracy (CMD), a civil society group that deals with democracy issues in multi-party politics.

Muturi was formerly a judiciary employee serving as a principal magistrate between 1982 and 1997 before retiring from judicial service. He also served as the chairman of the Judges and Magistrates Association during the time. He was a member of the Africa Parliamentarians Network Against Corruption, Global Organisation of Parliamentarians Against Corruption and the Parliamentary Network on the World Bank.

Accusation of bribery
In 1997, while serving as a Magistrate in Nairobi, Muturi was accused of soliciting a bribe to rule in favour of Masaba Hospital founder Dr Geoffrey Joel Momanyi and his wife Fellgona Akothe Momanyi in a case before him. Muturi was acquitted but did not resume his duties as a magistrate.

References

 Speaker Justin Muturi official site for the Speaker's Office
 
 
 

Living people
1956 births
Kenya African National Union politicians
Party of National Unity (Kenya) politicians
Speakers of the National Assembly of Kenya
Place of birth missing (living people)